Joseph Worthington White (October 2, 1822 – August 6, 1892) was an American lawyer and politician who served one term as a U.S. Representative from Ohio from 1863 to 1865.

Biography 
Born in Cambridge, Ohio, White attended the common schools and Cambridge Academy.
He engaged in mercantile pursuits.
He studied law.
He was admitted to the bar in 1844, and commenced practice in Cambridge.
He served as prosecuting attorney of Guernsey County 1845-1847.
He served as mayor of Cambridge.
He served as delegate to the 1860 Democratic National Convention.

Congress 
White was elected as a Democrat to the Thirty-eighth Congress (March 4, 1863 – March 4, 1865).
He was an unsuccessful for reelection in 1864 to the Thirty-ninth Congress.

Later career and death 
He resumed the practice of law.
He died in Cambridge, Ohio, August 6, 1892.
He was interred in the South Cemetery.

Sources

1822 births
1892 deaths
People from Cambridge, Ohio
County district attorneys in Ohio
Mayors of places in Ohio
19th-century American politicians
Democratic Party members of the United States House of Representatives from Ohio